Hamley Run is an unincorporated community in Athens County, in the U.S. state of Ohio.

History
A post office was established at Hamley Run in 1890, and remained in operation until 1894. Hamley Run originally was a mining community.

References

Unincorporated communities in Athens County, Ohio
1890 establishments in Ohio
Populated places established in 1890
Unincorporated communities in Ohio